Biagio Meccariello (born 27 March 1991) is an Italian footballer who plays for Serie B club SPAL.

Biography
Meccariello started his senior career with Serie D (amateur/non-professional) club Viribus Unitis. He was selected to national under-18 amateur team in April 2010. On 6 July 2011, Meccariello was signed by Lega Pro Prima Divisione club A.S. Andria BAT along with Angelo Tartaglia. (Italian third highest level). That season he was selected twice to the representative team of Lega Pro (ex- Serie C), against Palestine Olympic (no line-up) and England C.

On 8 August 2012, Meccariello was sold to Serie B newcomers Ternana. He wore no.19 for his new team.

On 17 August 2018, he joined Serie B club Lecce on a season-long loan with a buyout option. Lecce activated the buyout option at the end of the season.

On 6 January 2022, he signed a 2.5-year contract with SPAL in Serie B.

References

External links
 Football.it Profile 
 

1991 births
Sportspeople from Benevento
Living people
Italian footballers
Association football defenders
S.S. Fidelis Andria 1928 players
Ternana Calcio players
Brescia Calcio players
U.S. Lecce players
S.P.A.L. players
Serie B players
Serie C players
Serie D players
Universiade gold medalists for Italy
Universiade medalists in football
Footballers from Campania